Czterdziestolatek or 40-latek (English: The Forty-Year-Old); broadcast in English  by TVP Polonia as Being Forty is a Polish television comedy series originally  broadcast in Poland between 1975-78. The initial series enjoyed so much popularity that it was continued and led to the release of a feature film I'm a Butterfly, a 40-year-old's Love Affair and a New Year's Eve television program in 1975.

The series was written by Jerzy Gruza and Krzysztof Teodor Toeplitz and was broadcast on Telewizja Polska. In total, 21 episodes were produced.

The series followed the fate of a Warsaw family and explored topics related to midlife crisis, such as extra-marital affairs, attempts to quit smoking, obsession with hair loss, efforts to maintain physical fitness, pride in achievements and professional life, the desire to seek self-fulfillment through social activities, etc.

20 years later the series was remade in the mid-1990s with a cast that included Joanna Kurowska, Wojciech Mann and Wojciech Malajkat.

Episodes
 The toast, or closer than further (Toast czyli bliżej niż dalej) 1974
 Struggle with addiction, or maze (Walka z nałogiem czyli labirynt)
 Come by whenever you'd like, or dulled stimuli (Wpadnij kiedy zechcesz czyli bodźce stępione)
 The portrait, or how to be loved (Portret czyli jak być kochanym)
 Physical fitness, or the fight against the birth certificate (Kondycja fizyczna czyli walka z metryką)
 Flora's hair, or the maze (Włosy Flory czyli labirynt)
 Judym or a social action (Judym czyli czyn społeczny)
 Opening of the route, or free time (Otwarcie trasy czyli czas wolny) 1975
 Family, or strangers at home (Rodzina czyli obcy w domu) 1975
 Postcard from Spitsbergen, or enchantment (Pocztówka ze Spitzbergenu czyli oczarowanie) 1975
 Somebody else's misery, or defense witness (Cudze nieszczęście czyli świadek obrony) 1975
 New deputy, or the meteor (Nowy zastępca czyli meteor) 1975
 The scapegoat, or  the rotation (Kozioł ofiarny czyli rotacja) 1975
 Małkiewicz case or kamikaze (Sprawa Małkiewicza czyli kamikadze) 1976
 Expensive gift or revisit (Kosztowny drobiazg czyli rewizyta) 1976
 Where have you been or Shakespeare (Gdzie byłaś czyli Szekspir) 1976
 A cunning beast, or the cristal (Cwana bestia czyli kryształ) 1977
 War game or on the billet (Gra wojenna czyli na kwaterze) 1977
 Away from people, or something of your own (Z dala od ludzi czyli coś swojego)
 In self-defense, or the hunt (W obronie własnej czyli polowanie)
 Shadow-line, or the first serious warning (Smuga cienia czyli pierwsze poważne ostrzeżenie) 1977

Cast
 Andrzej Kopiczyński as Stefan Karwowski, Czterdziestolatek
 Anna Seniuk as Magda Karwowska, wife of Stefan Karwowski
 Irena Kwiatkowska 
 Roman Kłosowski
 Janusz Kłosiński
 Leonard Pietraszak
 Janusz Gajos
 Halina Kossobudzka
 Władysław Hańcza
 Wojciech Pokora
 Katarzyna Łaniewska
 Mieczysław Waśkowski
 Zdzisław Maklakiewicz
 Bohdan Ejmont
 Ryszard Pietruski
 Stefan Friedmann
 Stanisław Tym
 Wacław Kowalski
 Jarosław Skulski
 Leon Niemczyk
 Grażyna Szapołowska
 Alina Janowska
 Bożena Dykiel
 Edward Dziewoński
 Piotr Fronczewski
 Tadeusz Pluciński
 Lech Ordon
 Wojciech Pszoniak
 Jan Pietrzak
 Krystyna Feldman
 Jerzy Turek
 Joanna Szczepkowska
 Wiesław Gołas
 Jan Kobuszewski
 Andrzej Krasicki
 Aleksander Sewruk
 Jan Kociniak
 Krzysztof Kowalewski

References

External links

Polish comedy-drama television series
1970s Polish television series
1974 Polish television series debuts
1977 Polish television series endings
Midlife crisis in television
Telewizja Polska original programming